Adelotremus leptus is a species of combtooth blenny native to the Red Sea where it is only known from Marsa el At, Egypt. It has a slender body. The first specimen, a female, measured  SL, and others have been recorded since. Until 2017 this species was considered to be the only species in the monotypic genus Adelotremus. In 2017 a second species, Adelotremus deloachi was described from Indonesia.

References

leptus
Fish described in 2012